Warm Blood may refer to:

Warmbloods, a middle-weight horse type and breed
 Warm Blood, album by Carol Grimes
"Warm Blood", song by Icelandic band Seabear on album We Built a Fire
"Warm Blood" (Carly Rae Jepsen song)

See also 

 "My Warm Blood", a song by the Microphones from The Glow Pt. 2